Antoniny can refer to:
 Antoniny, an urban-type settlement in Ukraine
 Antoniny, Chodzież County, a village in Poland
 Antoniny, Szamotuły County, a village in Poland

See also

Antonin (disambiguation)
Antonina (disambiguation)
Antonine (name)
Antonini (disambiguation)
Antonino (disambiguation)